Mordelles (Gallo: Mordèll) is a commune in the Ille-et-Vilaine department of Brittany in northwestern France.

Geography
The river Meu forms the commune's southwestern border.

Population
Inhabitants of Mordelles are called in French Mordelais.

See also
Communes of the Ille-et-Vilaine department

References

External links

Official website 

Mayors of Ille-et-Vilaine Association 

Communes of Ille-et-Vilaine